Robert Fogle Milliken (August 25, 1926 – January 4, 2007) was a reliever and spot starter in Major League Baseball who played for the Brooklyn Dodgers (1953–54). Milliken batted and threw right-handed. He was born in Majorsville, West Virginia.

Milliken pitched in the minor leagues with Fort Worth (1948–49) and  Montreal (1950) before joining the military from 1951 to 1952. After being discharged, he helped the Brooklyn Dodgers to clinch the 1953 National League pennant with an 8–4 mark, 65 strikeouts, 117 innings, and a 3.37 ERA in 37 appearances, including 10 starts. He faced the New York Yankees in the World Series of that year and pitched two innings of shutout relief. In 1954 he went 5–2 with two saves in 24 games, three as a starter, as he recorded a 4.02 ERA in a league where the pitchers averaged 4.07. After that, he suffered arm problems and did not return to the major leagues.

From 1955 to 1956 Milliken divided his playing time between Fort Worth and Montreal. Following his playing retirement, he returned to the majors as a batting practice pitcher (1963–1964) and bullpen and pitching coach with the St. Louis Cardinals (1965–70, 1976). He is given credit in the SABR biography of Jim Willoughby for straightening out his delivery in 1975, while Milliken served as the Redbirds' minor-league pitching instructor and Willoughby was with the Triple-A Tulsa Oilers. Later, he was a St. Louis scout.

In 61 major league appearances, Milliken posted a 13–6 record with a 3.59 ERA, four saves, and 90 strikeouts in 180 innings, including 13 starts and three complete games.

Milliken died in Clearwater, Florida, at the age of 80. According to his obituary, he had spent 58 years in baseball.

See also
 List of St. Louis Cardinals coaches

References

External links

Baseball Almanac
Historic Baseball

1926 births
2007 deaths
Atlanta Crackers players
Baseball players from West Virginia
Brooklyn Dodgers players
Danville Dodgers players
Fort Worth Cats players
Macon Dodgers players
Major League Baseball bullpen coaches
Major League Baseball pitchers
Major League Baseball pitching coaches
Memphis Chickasaws players
Montreal Royals players
People from Marshall County, West Virginia
Portsmouth-Norfolk Tides players
Rochester Red Wings players
St. Louis Cardinals coaches
St. Louis Cardinals scouts
St. Paul Saints (AA) players
Spokane Indians players